Year 1513 (MDXIII) was a common year starting on Saturday (link will display the full calendar) of the Julian calendar.

Events 
 January–June 
 March 9 – Pope Leo X (layman Giovanni di Lorenzo de' Medici) succeeds Pope Julius II, as the 217th pope, despite a strong challenge by Hungarian cardinal Tamás Bakócz.
 March 27 – Juan Ponce de León becomes the first European definitely known to sight Florida, mistaking it for another island.
 April 2 – Juan Ponce de León and his expedition become the first Europeans known to visit Florida, landing somewhere on the east coast.
 April 2 – Juan Garrido (as part of Juan Ponce de León's expedition) becomes the first African known to visit North America, landing somewhere on the east coast of Florida.
 May – Portuguese explorer Jorge Álvares lands on Lintin Island, in the Pearl River estuary.
 June 6 – Italian Wars – Battle of Novara: Swiss mercenaries defeat the French under Louis II de la Trémoille, forcing the French to abandon Milan.  Duke Massimiliano Sforza is restored.

 July–December 
 July 22 – Christian II becomes King of Denmark and Norway.
 August 16 – Battle of Dubica (part of the Hundred Years' Croatian–Ottoman War): Croatian troops under Petar Berislavić, Ban (Viceroy) of Croatia, defeat an Ottoman army under Sanjak-bey Junuz-aga 
 August 16 – Battle of the Spurs (or Battle of Guinegate, part of the War of the League of Cambrai): English and allied troops under Henry VIII defeat French cavalry under Marshal La Palice.
 August 22 – Thérouanne is captured by Henry VIII of England.
 September – The dispute between Johann Reuchlin and Johannes Pfefferkorn concerning the Talmud and other Jewish books, is referred to Pope Leo X.
 September 9 – Battle of Flodden: King James IV of Scotland is defeated and killed by an English army under Thomas Howard, Earl of Surrey. James's son, the Duke of Rothesay, becomes James V, King of Scots.
 September 25 – Vasco Núñez de Balboa, "silent upon a peak in Darién", first sees what will become known as the Pacific Ocean.
 October 7 – Battle of La Motta (War of the League of Cambrai): Spanish troops under Ramón de Cardona and Fernando d'Avalos decisively defeat those of the Republic of Venice under Bartolomeo d'Alviano on Venetian territory.
 December
 Louis XII of France makes peace with the Pope and Spain.
 A major landslide occurs near Bellinzona.

 Undated 
 Appenzell becomes a member of the Swiss Confederacy.
 Niccolò Machiavelli is banished from Florence by the House of Medici, and writes The Prince.
 Leo Africanus visits Timbuktu, second city of the Songhai Empire.
 Paracelsus begins studying at Ferrara University.

Births 

 February 14 – Domenico Ferrabosco, Italian composer (d. 1573)
 March 15 – Hedwig Jagiellon, Electress of Brandenburg (d. 1573)
 April 22 – Tachibana Dōsetsu, Japanese Daimyō (d. 1585)
 June 10 – Louis, Duke of Montpensier (1561–1582) (d. 1582)
 August 3 – John, Margrave of Brandenburg-Küstrin (d. 1571)
 September 23 – Hans Buser, Swiss noble (d. 1544)
 September 24 – Catherine of Saxe-Lauenburg, queen of Gustav I of Sweden (d. 1535)
 October 30 – Jacques Amyot, French writer (d. 1593)
 December 3 – Lorenzo Strozzi, Italian Catholic cardinal (d. 1571)
 December 23 – Thomas Smith, English scholar and diplomat (d. 1577)
 date unknown
 Abe Motozane, Japanese general (d. 1587)
 Anna Hogenskild, Swedish lady-in-waiting (d. 1590) 
 Michael Baius, Belgian theologian (d. 1589)
 George Cassander, Flemish theologian (d. 1566)
 Thomas FitzGerald, 10th Earl of Kildare (d. 1537)
 Elisabeth Plainacher, Austrian alleged witch (d. 1583) 
 probable – Elizabeth Seymour, English noble, sister-in-law of Henry VIII of England (d. 1563)

Deaths 

 January – Hans Folz, German author (b. c. 1437)
 January 20 – Helena of Moscow, Grand Duchess consort of Lithuania and queen consort of Poland (b. 1476)
 February 20 – King John of Denmark, Norway, and Sweden (b. 1455)
 February 21 – Pope Julius II (b. 1443)
 March 10 – John de Vere, 13th Earl of Oxford, English general (b. 1443)
 April 24 – Şehzade Ahmet, oldest son of Sultan Bayezid II (executed) (b. 1465)
 April 30 – Edmund de la Pole, 3rd Duke of Suffolk, Duke of Suffolk (b. 1471)
 August 3 – Ernst II of Saxony, Archbishop of Magdeburg (1476–1513) and Administrator of Halberstadt (b. 1464)
 September 9 (killed at the Battle of Flodden)
 James IV of Scotland (b. 1473)
 George Douglas, Master of Angus (b. 1469)
 William Douglas of Glenbervie (b. 1473)
 William Graham, 1st Earl of Montrose, Scottish politician (b. 1464)
 George Hepburn, Scottish bishop
 Adam Hepburn, 2nd Earl of Bothwell, Scottish politician, Lord High Admiral of Scotland
 Adam Hepburn of Craggis
 David Kennedy, 1st Earl of Cassilis, Scottish soldier (b. 1478)
 Alexander Lauder of Blyth, Scottish politician 
 Alexander Stewart, Scottish archbishop (b. 1493)
 Matthew Stewart, 2nd Earl of Lennox, Scottish politician (b. 1488)
 October 27 – George Manners, 11th Baron de Ros, English nobleman
 date unknown
 Robert Fabyan, English chronicler
 Claudine de Brosse, duchess Consort of Savoy (b. 1450)
 Hua Sui, Chinese inventor and printer (b. 1439)

References